Estadio Municipal de Balboa is a multi-purpose stadium in Balboa, Panama.  It is currently used mostly for football matches and is the home stadium of Municipal Chorrillo.  The stadium holds 2,000 people.

The stadium was originally part of the Balboa High School campus, and was used mostly to play football and baseball.

Currently the field is administered by the Panama Canal Authority.

Football venues in Panama
Multi-purpose stadiums in Panama
Sports venues in Panama City